Vyacheslav Anatolevich "Slava" Kozlov (born May 3, 1972) is a Russian former professional ice hockey left winger.

Kozlov was a member of the Stanley Cup winning Detroit Red Wings teams of 1997 and 1998, and was also a member of the famed Russian Five. He also later played for the Buffalo Sabres and Atlanta Thrashers.

Playing career

Detroit Red Wings
Kozlov was drafted 45th overall by the Detroit Red Wings in the 1990 NHL Entry Draft. Kozlov made his NHL debut on March 12, 1992, recording two assists in Detroit's 5–4 win over the St. Louis Blues. He became a regular player with Detroit in the 1993–94 NHL season. After the Red Wings acquired Igor Larionov in 1995, coach Scotty Bowman created a 5–man Russian unit (the "Russian Five") consisting of forwards Kozlov, Sergei Fedorov and Igor Larionov, and defensemen Vladimir Konstantinov and Viacheslav Fetisov. This group helped Detroit to a Stanley Cup win in 1997. Kozlov was also a contributing member of the team during their second consecutive Stanley Cup run in 1998.

Buffalo Sabres
Kozlov played for Detroit until the summer of 2001, when he was traded to the Buffalo Sabres as part of a package for Dominik Hašek. After one injury-shortened season in Buffalo, Kozlov was traded to the Atlanta Thrashers.

Atlanta Thrashers
Kozlov served as team captain for Atlanta as part of a rotating captaincy during his first season in Atlanta until Shawn McEachern was announced as the sole captain for the rest of the 2002–03 season in February.

Since the inception of the shootout into NHL play in 2005, Kozlov has been known as the league's best scorer in the shootouts as of the end of the 2008–09 season.

Kozlov re-signed with the Thrashers on July 4, 2007, signing a three-year, $11–million contract with a no-trade clause. Kozlov played his 1,000th NHL game on December 26, 2007, against the Columbus Blue Jackets and his former Russian Five teammate, Sergei Fedorov. After scoring only 41 points during the 2007–08 season, he bounced back in 2008–09 with one of the best seasons of his career, scoring 26 goals and 76 points.

Rick Dudley announced that Atlanta would not re-sign Kozlov for the 2010-11 NHL season.

KHL
In 2010, Kozlov signed a 1-year deal with HC CSKA Moscow. In February 2011 Kozlov left CSKA to join playoff-bound Salavat Yulaev Ufa. He participated in the team's final four regular season games and all of its playoff contests. Ufa's star-studded team advanced to the KHL finals and captured the Gagarin Cup, beating Atlant Moscow Oblast 4 games to 1.

On May 19, 2011, he signed a one-year contract with HC Dynamo Moscow, with whom he won his second Gagarin Cup.

Kozlov joined HC Spartak Moscow late in the 2012–13 season, playing in just 13 games. On March 19, 2013, he signed a one-year extension with the team. He finished the 2013–14 season recording eight goals and 18 assists in 54 games.

On July 15, 2014, he signed a one-year contract with Atlant Moscow Oblast.

After the 2014–15 season, Kozlov announced his retirement after playing 28 years of ice hockey. He is currently an assistant coach for Spartak Moscow.

Personal life
In October 1991, Kozlov was driving his car when a bus hit it. His passenger, fellow prospect Kirill Tarasov, was killed, and Kozlov suffered massive injuries, including a brain injury that put his playing future in doubt. After facial reconstruction surgery and lengthy rehabilitation, he was able to return to ice hockey. Kozlov and his wife, Tatyana, have three children: Nikita, Ksenia, and Alexandr. Nikita plays tennis professionally. Kozlov is the brother-in-law of former NHL player Evgeny Namestnikov and uncle of current NHL player Vladislav Namestnikov. On 11 October 2020, Vladislav signed a two-year, $4 million contract with the Detroit Red Wings, Kozlov's former team.

International play

Kozlov has participated in nine international tournaments for the Soviet Union/Russia:
1988 IIHF European Junior Championships
1989 IIHF European Junior Championships
1990 IIHF European Junior Championships
1990 World Junior Ice Hockey Championships
1991 World Junior Ice Hockey Championships
1991 Men's World Ice Hockey Championships
1991 Canada Cup
1994 Men's World Ice Hockey Championships
1996 World Cup of Hockey

Career statistics

Regular season and playoffs

International

Awards
2-time Stanley Cup champion (1997, 1998)
2-time Gagarin Cup champion (2011, 2012)
Dan Snyder Memorial Award (2007)

See also
 List of NHL players with 1,000 games played

References

2005 NHL Official Guide & Record Book

External links

1972 births
Adirondack Red Wings players
Ak Bars Kazan players
Atlanta Thrashers players
Buffalo Sabres players
Detroit Red Wings draft picks
Detroit Red Wings players
Atlant Moscow Oblast players
HC CSKA Moscow players
HC Dynamo Moscow players
HC Khimik Voskresensk players
HC Spartak Moscow players
Living people
People from Voskresensk
Russian ice hockey left wingers
Salavat Yulaev Ufa players
Stanley Cup champions
Soviet defectors to the United States
Sportspeople from Moscow Oblast